In geometry, the parabiaugmented truncated dodecahedron is one of the Johnson solids. As its name suggests, it is created by attaching two pentagonal cupolas onto two parallel decagonal faces of a truncated dodecahedron.

External links
 

Johnson solids